Elvira Lind (born October 28, 1981) is a Danish film director based in New York City.

Career 
In 2014, Lind's first documentary feature Songs for Alexis premiered at Hot Docs in Toronto and won many international film festivals across the world. Elvira won the Reel Talent Award at the Copenhagen Documentary Festival for her work. In 2017, Lind directed a new feature documentary, Bobbi Jene. It premiered at the Tribeca Film Festival where it won all awards in its category: Best Documentary Feature, Best Cinematography in a Documentary Feature and Best Editing in a Documentary Feature. In November 2020, Lind's first fiction short film The Letter Room premiered at HollyShorts Film Festival. It was also nominated for Best Short Film at Tribeca Film Festival, Palm Springs International ShortFest and Telluride Film Festival. She was nominated for Best Live Action Short Film in the 93rd Academy Awards.

Personal life 
Lind met Guatemalan-American actor Oscar Isaac in 2012, and they married in February 2017. They have two sons, and live in Williamsburg, Brooklyn.

Filmography

References

External links 
 
 Official website of Elvira Lind

Living people
1981 births
Danish expatriates in South Africa
Danish expatriates in the United States
Danish women film directors
Danish women screenwriters